The 1921 Rochester Jeffersons season was their second in the National Football League. The team failed to improve on their previous record against league teams of 6–3–2, winning only two games. They finished tenth in the league.  The Union Quakers were able to arrange a game with Rochester to make up for the loss of a game between the Quakers and the Canton Bulldogs. The Jeffersons played the Quakers to a 3–3 tie. Since the Jeffs were losing large amounts of money during the 1921 season and needed the revenue from the Union Quakers game, the APFA decided to not interfere.

Schedule

Games in italics are against non-NFL teams.

Standings

References

Rochester Jeffersons seasons
Rochester Jeffersons
Rochester Jeffersons